Sham Shui Po Public Dispensary is two-storey medical complex and Grade II historical building built in the 1930s on Yee Kuk street in Hong Kong.

History
The facility dates to the early 20th century when the community members of Sham Shui Po established a public clinic due to the lack of medical care facilities for local residents. 

With the introduction of the government Methadone Treatment Scheme in 1972, the dispensary became one of Hong Kong's methadone treatment centres, and is now known as Sham Shui Po Methadone Clinic and is maintained by Auxiliary Medical Service.

References 

Buildings and structures in Hong Kong
Sham Shui Po
Grade II historic buildings in Hong Kong